Tütüncüler may refer to the following places in Turkey:

 Tütüncüler, Artvin
 Tütüncüler, Bozdoğan